Arthur Mitchell Wilson (24 August 1888 – 19 December 1947) DSO was a gynaecologist and obstetrician and an Australian rules footballer who played for the University Football Club in the Victorian Football League (VFL).

He was a foundation fellow of the Royal College of Obstetricians and Gynaecologists.

The Arthur Wilson Memorial Scholarship was established in 1987 with funds from the Arthur Wilson Memorial Foundation. The Foundation had been created in 1951 after a public appeal was launched to perpetuate the memory of Arthur Wilson, an outstanding gynaecologist and obstetrician. The Foundation raised funds for the Arthur Wilson Memorial Wing (1954) to be built as an extension to the south side of the Royal Society of Victoria's Hall (1859) at 8 La Trobe St, Melbourne to house the Royal Australian College of Obstetricians and Gynaecologists.

His son Mac played league football for Melbourne in the 1940s.

Sources
 https://web.archive.org/web/20091024124232/http://www.ranzcog.edu.au/research/arthurwilson.shtml

External links
 Australian Dictionary of Biography

1888 births
Australian rules footballers from Victoria (Australia)
University Football Club players
1947 deaths
People educated at Scotch College, Melbourne
Australian military personnel of World War I
Australian gynaecologists